Vernon Chabrol (16 May 1909 – 24 July 1968) was a Guyanese cricketer. He played in two first-class matches for British Guiana in 1929/30.

See also
 List of Guyanese representative cricketers

References

External links
 

1909 births
1968 deaths
Guyanese cricketers
Guyana cricketers